Frontier Martial-Arts Wrestling held a variety of professional wrestling tournaments competed for by wrestlers that were part of their roster during its existence between 1989 and 2001.

Sporadic tournaments

Battle Resistance Open Tournament

FMW's first tournament, a single-elimination tournament took place at the Battle Resistance - 1st Open Tournament event on January 7, 1990. Aside from the tournament, the event also featured a women's wrestling match between Miwa Sato and Kumiko Matsuda.

Non-tournament match

AWA World Light Heavyweight Championship Tournament
A six-man tournament was set up for the vacant AWA World Light Heavyweight Championship on September 25, 1990 after previous champion Lee Gak-soo left FMW earlier that month. Katsuji Ueda defeated Jimmy Backlund in the tournament final to win the vacant title.

FMW Tag Team Tournament
The FMW Tag Team Tournament was a six-team tournament held by FMW from January 6 to January 15, 1991. The opening round was a round-robin tournament in which five teams scored 3 points to qualify for the knockout format to determine the winner, while the team of Lee Gak-soo and Nam Sung Gun was the only team which failed to qualify as they lost all of their matches and scored 0 points. The knockout format took place on January 15, 1991.

Round-robin stage

Knockout stage

Barbed Wire Deathmatch Tournament
The Barbed Wire Deathmatch Tournament was a single-elimination tournament in which all matches were no rope barbed wire deathmatches. The tournament took place on August 17, 1991.

World's Strongest Tag Team Tournament
World's Strongest Tag Team Tournament was a ten-team tag team tournament conducted from November 20 to December 9, 1991 to determine the inaugural WWA World Martial Arts Tag Team Champions. The first stage was round robin and the second stage was contested in knockout format after one team topped the round robin format while two teams tied with 7 points and they had a playoff match to take on the topping team in the final round.

Round-robin stage

Knockout stage

FMW Women's Tag Team Tournament
The FMW Women's Tag Team Tournament was a round-robin tag team tournament between female wrestlers of the promotion that took place between June 16 and June 28, 1992.

Street Fight Tag Team Tournament
The Street Fight Tag Team Tournament was a tag team tournament which took place between November 20 and December 7, 1992. Every match in the tournament was a street fight. The first stage was a round-robin stage in which the three top scoring teams qualified for the knockout stage while the team of Atsushi Onita and Grigory Verichev defeated Dr. Luther and Dr. Hannibal in a playoff to qualify for the knockout as both teams were tied at 4 points.

Round-robin stage

Knockout stage

FMW Independent World Junior Heavyweight Championship Tournament
The Independent Junior Heavyweight Tournament was a round-robin tournament to crown the first FMW Independent World Junior Heavyweight Champion. The tournament was held between September 17 and September 27, 1993. The Great Sasuke was given a bye in the tournament and the winner of the tournament would face him for the title on October 28.

Nakagawa suffered an arm injury, so Ezaki advanced to the semi-final.

Damian was unable to compete and was replaced by Battle Ranger Z to face Sasuke for the title.

WWA World Women's Championship #1 Contender's Tournament
A tournament was held in October 1993 to determine the #1 contender to the WWA World Women's Championship held by Combat Toyoda. The four-woman tournament was first conducted in a round robin format and the top two females competed in the final round on October 28, 1993. Crusher Maedomari won the tournament and defeated Toyoda to win the title on October 31.

Round-robin stage

Knockout stage

FMW Brass Knuckles Tag Team Championship Tournament (1994)
A double-elimination tournament was held to crown the new FMW Brass Knuckles Tag Team Champions after the WWA version of the title was retired in 1992. The tournament was held between January 7, 1994 and January 18, 1994. The losing teams competed in Block B and the winners of Block B faced the winners of Block A in the tournament final on January 18. All the matches in the tournament were either street fights or deathmatches.

Block A

Loser's Block B

FMW Independent Women's / WWA World Women's Championship Tournament
A tournament was held for the vacant FMW Independent Women's / WWA World Women's Championship after champion Crusher Maedomari vacated the title to participate in the tournament. The tournament was held between February 11 and February 25, 1994.

Shark Tsuchiya replaced Crusher Maedomari in the Block B final.

Six Man Tag Team Tournament
The Six Man Tag Team Tournament was a tournament held on March 13, 1994 in which all matches were six-man tag team matches.

Young Spirit Tournament
The Young Spirit Tournament was a tournament consisting of young and rising stars of FMW who were representing the company's New Generation after Atsushi Onita retired from wrestling and left the company. The tournament was held to choose a rising star who could lead the company into the next generation. The tournament took place between July 18 and July 30, 1995. The finalists of the tournament were entered into the Grand Slam Tournament for the vacant FMW Brass Knuckles Heavyweight Championship.

Round-robin stage

Knockout stage

Grand Slam Tournament

The Grand Slam Tournament was a round-robin tournament held to crown a new FMW Brass Knuckles Heavyweight Champion after the previous champion Hayabusa vacated the title due to injury. The tournament was held between August 22 and September 26, 1995.

Round-robin stage

Knockout stage

FMW Independent Heavyweight Championship Tournament

The FMW Independent Heavyweight Championship Tournament was a tournament for the newly created FMW Independent Heavyweight Championship. The tournament took place between May 26 and August 1, 1996.

This match was a Caribbean Barbed Wire Deathmatch.

FMW World Street Fight 6-Man Tag Team Championship Tournament
The FMW World Street Fight 6-Man Tag Team Championship Tournament was a tournament which took place on August 5, 1997 for the vacant FMW World Street Fight 6-Man Tag Team Championship after the title was vacated by Fuyuki-Gun (Kodo Fuyuki, Jado and Gedo).

FMW Double Championship #1 Contender's Tournament

The FMW Double Championship #1 Contender's Tournament was a tournament to determine the #1 contender for Mr. Gannosuke's FMW Brass Knuckles Heavyweight Championship and FMW Independent Heavyweight Championship at FMW's first pay-per-view Entertainment Wrestling Live. The tournament was held between March 7 and March 17, 1998.

Over the Top Tournament

The Over the Top Tournament was a tournament to determine the #1 contender for Kodo Fuyuki's FMW Brass Knuckles Heavyweight Championship and FMW Independent Heavyweight Championship on the March 19, 1999 pay-per-view. The event took place between December 9, 1998 and January 5, 1999. Fuyuki himself participated in the tournament to get a title shot in case he lost the title before the pay-per-view.

FMW Brass Knuckles Tag Team Championship Tournament (1999)
The FMW Brass Knuckles Tag Team Championship Tournament was held for the FMW Brass Knuckles Tag Team Championship after previous champions Hayabusa and Daisuke Ikeda vacated the titles due to Ikeda's health problems. This was an eight-team round-robin tournament taking place between March 20 and May 3, 1999.

Round-robin stage

Knockout stage

WEW 6-Man Tag Team Championship Tournament

A tournament was set up for the newly created WEW 6-Man Tag Team Championship, which replaced FMW World Street Fight 6-Man Tag Team Championship in 1999. A four-team round-robin tournament took place between July 18 and July 31, 1999 during the Goodbye Hayabusa tour.
Round-robin stage

Knockout stage

WEW Tag Team Championship Tournament
The WEW Tag Team Championship Tournament was held for the WEW Tag Team Championship on December 21, 2001 after previous champions Hayabusa and Tetsuhiro Kuroda were forced to vacate the title due to Hayabusa's injury.

References

Tournaments
Professional wrestling tournaments
Professional wrestling-related lists